Bauska Municipality is a municipality in Zemgale, Latvia. The municipality was formed in 2009 by merging Brunava parish, Ceraukste parish, Code parish, Dāviņi parish, Gailīši parish, Īslīce parish, Mežotne parish, Vecsaule parish and Bauska town, the administrative centre being Bauska.

On 1 July 2021, Bauska Municipality was enlarged when Iecava Municipality, Rundāle Municipality and Vecumnieki Municipality ceased to exist and their territory was merged into Bauska Municipality. Since that date, Bauska Municipality consists of the following administrative units: Bauska town, Bārbele Parish, Brunava Parish, Ceraukste Parish, Code Parish, Dāviņi Parish, Gailīši Parish, Iecava Parish, Iecava town, Īslīce Parish, Kurmene Parish, Mežotne Parish, Rundāle Parish, Skaistkalne Parish, Stelpe Parish, Svitene Parish, Valle Parish, Vecsaule Parish, Vecumnieki Parish and Viesturi Parish.

Latvian law defines the entire territory of Bauska Municipality as a part of the Semigallia region.

Twin towns — sister cities

Bauska is twinned with:

 Hedemora, Sweden
 Khashuri, Georgia
 Náchod, Czech Republic
 Pakruojis, Lithuania
 Radviliškis, Lithuania
 Rypin, Poland
 Soroca, Moldova

Images

See also
 History of Bauska
 Administrative divisions of Latvia (2009)

References

 
Municipalities of Latvia
Semigallia